How to Host a Murder is a long-running series of boxed murder mystery games published by Decipher, Inc. Players take on the roles of suspects after a murder has occurred, all attempting to expose which one of them is the murderer. The setting is supposed to be humorous, with players dressing in costumes and overacting their parts.

The first game in the series, The Watersdown Affair, was published in 1985. Sixteen other How to Host a Murder games have been published since, and the line has also spun off into lines like How to Host a Teen Mystery, a single adult How to Host a Mystery, the kids games How to Host a Kids Party & How to Host a Scavenger Hunt, and the more romantically inclined How to Host a Romantic Evening. The last release was in 2003, but Decipher announced in 2012 new material relating to the series would be appearing on their website, suggesting new releases may occur soon. Decipher's website was updated to announce that these new games would be coming in 2017.

Games

How To Host a Murder Editions

How To Host A Teen Mystery Editions

Reception
Creede Lambard reviewed The Watersdown Affair in Space Gamer No. 76, and commented that "And the verdict? I cannot recommend this game highly enough. If your dinner parties are becoming a bit dull, or if you and seven or more of your friends want to have a great time one evening, buy The Watersdown Affair."

Notes

References

Decipher, Inc. games
Live-action role-playing games